The Mortier de 280 TR Modèle 1914 Schneider was a French siege howitzer manufactured by the Schneider et Cie company, used during World War I.  The howitzer had its origins from a Russian Army policy to upgrade its artillery park after the poor showing of Russian artillery in the 1904-5 Russo-Japanese war. In 1909 an agreement was signed between Schneider and the Russian armaments manufacturer Putilov to jointly develop and produce a number of artillery types. Schneider delivered the first prototype of the siege howitzer to the Russians in 1912 for extensive testing. Although the Russians found the gun was unable to penetrate the heaviest reinforced concrete fortifications its general performance was judged satisfactory which led to an order for 16 howitzers to be delivered in 1915. The French Army expressed interest in the Schneider howitzer as a possible replacement for the Mortier de 370 Mle 1885 De Bange. After some dithering by French authorities 18 howitzers were ordered in 1913. Delivery of the howitzers to Russia and France was delayed by the general mobilisation of 1914 which disrupted industrial production. During the war 126 howitzers were delivered to the French Army and 26 to Russia as the 280 mm Schneider Mortar Model 1914/15 before the 1917 revolutions. In addition another 25 barrels were installed post-WW1 on the Saint-Chamond heavy self-propelled gun chassis as the Mortier 280 mm TR de Schneider sur affût-chenilles St Chamond.

The US Army selected the Schneider design as its first modern large-calibre siege howitzer, to be manufactured in the USA in 240 mm calibre and designated the M1918 240 mm Howitzer. However, this howitzer did not reach production until after the end of the war.

Description
The Mortier de 280 TR Mle 1914 Schneider was a siege howitzer of conventional design for its time. It used a hydro-pneumatic system to absorb the recoil forces generated when firing. The box carriage was mounted on a firing platform and only allowed 20° of traverse. One unusual feature was the presence of two large steel pads mounted on swinging outriggers at the rear of the firing platform to counter the over-turning couple experienced by large calibre howitzers firing at high elevation angles. A pit needed to be dug underneath the carriage to accommodate the recoil of the howitzer. The firing platform had a sheet steel box attached which fitted into the excavated hole. It had an interrupted-screw breech, with a de Bange obturator, and used bagged propellant. Shells were loaded onto the ammunition trolley that ran on rails behind the breech using the on-board crane and the trolley was moved adjacent to the breech after it had been brought back to the proper angle for loading. The projectiles were brought up from a battery ammunition dump on trolleys running on a narrow (60 cm) gauge railway track. It was dismantled into four loads, barrel, cradle, carriage and firing platform, for transport and carried on 4 horse-drawn carts. The design of the wagons to move the howitzer components was quite unusual. Rather than place the howitzer component on a wagon the howitzer component itself made up the chassis of the wagon. So, for instance, the barrel was moved by attaching two sets of wheels to the barrel. Although this design was innovative it proved to be quite weak in practice and the towing speeds of the howitzer were limited to barely above walking pace.

Operational use
The French Army Schneider howitzers debuted in April 1916 at the Battle of Verdun and saw service until the end of WW1 in two gun and later three gun batteries. Their primary roles were counter battery fire, although they were over-powered for this role, and reducing fortifications that resisted field artillery fire. The howitzers were generally reliable and well liked by their crews. When the war became mobile again over the last few months the Schneider howitzers were less useful than during the static phase of the war because of the long emplacement time and slow towing speeds.

The Schneider howitzers were still in the inventory at the beginning of World War II.  Four were used with success in June 1940 by French army against the Italian fortress at Chaberton on the French-Italian border. Some were used by the Germans, designated as 28 cm Mrs. 601 (f), after the Battle of France. One case was during the Siege of Leningrad in 1943-44.

In Russian service they saw action on the Eastern Front, during the Russian Civil War and the subsequent Polish-Bolshevik War. Some were captured by Poland during that conflict, although nothing is known of any use by them. In June, 1941 the Red Army still possessed 25 of these guns.

See also 
 Mortier 280 mm TR de Schneider sur affût-chenilles St Chamond - a two-piece self-propelled tracked version.

In museums
Poland
Museum of Polish Military Technology - Mortier de 280 modèle 1914 Schneider on transport cart, barrel serial number 6891, cart serial number 4443, additional markings "Mortira No1"

Notes

References

External links

Description 
"HEAVY SIEGE ARTILLERY IN THE EUROPEAN WAR". in "THE FIELD ARTILLERY JOURNAL". VOLUME IV NUMBER 3. JULY-SEPTEMBER 1914. THE UNITED STATES FIELD ARTILLERY ASSOCIATION WASHINGTON, D. C.
Captured artillery in German use (pdf)

World War I howitzers
World War II weapons of France
280 mm artillery
World War I artillery of France